Naraini is a constituency of the Uttar Pradesh Legislative Assembly covering the city of Naraini in the Banda district of Uttar Pradesh, India.

Naraini is one of five assembly constituencies in the Banda Lok Sabha constituency. Since 2008, this assembly constituency is numbered 234 amongst 403 constituencies.

Election results
भारतीय जनता पार्टी की उम्मीदवार ओममनी वर्मा ने किरण वर्मा को 6719 वोटो से हराया

2017
Bharatiya Janta Party candidate Raj Karan Kabir won in 2017 Uttar Pradesh Legislative Elections defeating INC candidate Bharat Lal Diwakar by a margin of 45,007 votes.

References

External links
 

Assembly constituencies of Uttar Pradesh
Banda district, India